Uwe Ehlers (born 8 March 1975) is a German former professional footballer who played as a defender. He managed Hansa Rostock in 2017.

References

External links

1975 births
Living people
Sportspeople from Rostock
German footballers
Germany under-21 international footballers
Germany B international footballers
Association football defenders
Bundesliga players
2. Bundesliga players
FC Hansa Rostock players
TSV 1860 Munich players
FC Augsburg players
FC Erzgebirge Aue players
VfL Osnabrück players
FC Hansa Rostock managers
3. Liga managers
Footballers from Mecklenburg-Western Pomerania
German football managers
FC Hansa Rostock non-playing staff